The Clausura 2013 season is the 30th edition of Primera División de Fútbol de El Salvador since its establishment of an Apertura and Clausura format. Isidro Metapán were the defending champions. The league consisted of 10 teams, each playing a home and away game against the other clubs for a total of 18 games, respectively. The top four teams at the end of the regular season took part in the playoffs.

Stadia and locations

Personnel and sponsoring

Managerial changes

Before the start of the season

During the season

League table

Results

Playoffs

Semi-finals

First leg

Second leg

Final

Player statistics

Top scorers

 Updated to games played on 25 May 2013. 
 Post-season goals are not included, only regular season goals.

Assists table

Goalkeepers

Bookings

Hat-tricks

Season statistics

Scoring
First goal of the season:  Anel Canales for Luis Ángel Firpo against UES, 42 minutes (2 February 2013)
Fastest goal in a match: 1 minutes –  Alexander Campos for Juventud Independiente against C.D. Luis Ángel Firpo (27 February 2013)
Goal scored at the latest point in a match:
First penalty Kick of the season:  Danilo Oliveira for Once Municipal against Luis Ángel Firpo, 86 minutes (9 February 2013)
Widest winning margin: 7 goals
Alianza 7–0 Once Municipal (10 March 2013)
First hat-trick of the season: Jonathan Faña for Alianza against Once Municipal (10 March 2013)
First own goal of the season: Mardoqueo Henriquez (Águila) for Atlético Marte (27 February 2013)
Most goals by one team in a match: 7 Goals
Alianza 7–0 Once Municipal (10 March 2013)
Most goals in one half by one team:
Most goals scored by losing team: 2 Goals
Santa Tecla 3–2 Once Municipal (2 February 2013)
Most goals by one player in a single match: 3 Goals
 Jonathan Faña for Alianza against Once Municipal (10 March 2013)

Discipline
First yellow card of the season:
First red card of the season:

List of foreign players in the league
This is a list of foreign players in Clausura 2012. The following players:
have played at least one apertura game for the respective club.
have not been capped for the El Salvador national football team on any level, independently from the birthplace

A new rule was introduced a few season ago, that clubs can only have three foreign players per club and can only add a new player if there is an injury or player/s is released.

C.D. Águila
  Yaikel Pérez
  Tiago dos Santos Roberto
  Heslley Couto

Alianza F.C.
  Jonathan Faña
  Jairo Araujo
  Orlando Rodríguez

Atlético Marte
  Daniel Ruiz
  Cristian Gil Mosquera
  Gonzalo Mazzia

Juventud Independiente
  Juan Carlos Reyes
  Mario Alberto Abadía

C.D. FAS
  Alejandro Bentos
  Juan Carlos Enríquez

 (player released mid season)

C.D. Luis Ángel Firpo
  Anel Canales
  Martin Mederos
  Luis Mendoza

A.D. Isidro Metapán
  Ernesto Aquino
  Jorge Ramírez
  Junio Pinto Catarin

Once Municipal
   Danilo Oliveira
  Carlos Regis Araujo

Santa Tecla F.C.
  Facundo Nicolás Simioli
  Christian Vaquero
  Rogelio Juárez

UES
 None

Aggregate table

References

External links
 http://www.primerafutboles.com/
 http://www.elgrafico.com/
 http://www.elsalvadorfc.com/
 http://www.culebritamacheteada.com.sv/
 http://www.elsalvadorfutbol.com/

Primera División de Fútbol Profesional Clausura seasons
El
1